Tor Wennesland (born 21 August 1952) is a Norwegian diplomat.

Holding the cand. theol. degree, he was first hired in the Ministry of Foreign Affairs in 1983.  

He has been appointed UN Special Coordinator for the Middle East Peace Process, replacing  Nickolay Mladenov.
He is currently Norway's Special Representative to the Middle East Peace Process, including the responsibility for Norway's chairmanship of the Ad Hoc Liaison Committee (AHLC) for Palestine. He was Norway's Representative to the Palestinian Authority from 2007 to 2011 and Norway's Ambassador to Egypt and Libya from 2012 to 2015.

External links 
UNSCO

References

1952 births
Living people
Norwegian diplomats
Norwegian expatriates in Israel
Ambassadors of Norway to Egypt
Ambassadors of Norway to Libya
People from Kristiansand